Witold Wypijewski (25 November 1907 – 25 November 1981) was a Polish footballer. He played in five matches for the Poland national football team from 1928 to 1934.

References

External links
 

1907 births
1981 deaths
Polish footballers
Poland international footballers
Place of birth missing
Association footballers not categorized by position